Daniel Moss may refer to:

 Dan Moss (born 2004), English footballer
 Daniel Moss (rugby league) (born 2002), English rugby league player